Dendropsophus anceps (common name: Estrella treefrog) is a species of frog in the family Hylidae.
It is endemic to the lowlands of southeastern Brazil. Its natural habitats are open, stagnant water bodies (swamps), including man-made pools. There are no significant threats to this very common species.

References

anceps
Endemic fauna of Brazil
Amphibians of Brazil
Amphibians described in 1929
Taxa named by Adolfo Lutz
Taxonomy articles created by Polbot